Život uživo is the debut studio album by Bosnian pop star Maya Berović. It was released August 2007 through the record label Grand Production in Bosnia and Herzegovina and Serbia.

Background
Aged 19 in 2006, Maya signed with the Belgrade-based record label Grand Production, co-owned by Lepa Brena and Saša Popović, and teamed up with Grand's main songwriter Marina Tucaković and composer and musician Aleksandar Milić as the producer.

Not long after the album's release, Berović parted ways with Grand Production. In 2015 she explained that she and Grand director Saša Popović had differing ideas and that she is happy with her current label City Records.

Singles
"Džin i limunada" was the album's only single and served as Maya's debut single. It was premiered shortly before the official release of Life in person in August 2007.

Track listing

Personnel

Instruments

Igor Malešević – drum programming
Petar Trumbetaš – guitar, bouzouki
Goran Radinović – keyboards
Zoran Kiki Caušević – percussion

Production and recording

Dejan Vučković – mixing
Aleksandar Milić – arrangement
Goran Radinović – programming

References

2008 debut albums
Maya Berović albums
Grand Production albums